Attys may refer to:
 Attis, a mythological figure
 Plural abbreviation of Attorney
 Slang for atomizer (plural), a component of an electronic cigarette